Sir Philip Sydney Jones (15 April 1836 – 18 September 1918) was an Australian medical practitioner and University of Sydney vice-chancellor 1904–1906. He was knighted in 1905 for his services to the treatment of tubercuulosis.  He carried out the first reported successful oophorectomy at Sydney Infirmary in 1870.

Early life
Sydney Jones was born in Sydney, the second son of David Jones, a Welsh immigrant who founded the department store David Jones Limited in 1838, and his second wife Jane Hall, née Mander. Jones was educated at private schools under William Timothy Cape, T. S. Dodds (in Surry Hills) and Henry Cary (in Darling Point), and then went to London in 1853 to study medicine at University College. During his course he took the medals for anatomy and medicine, graduated M.B. in 1859, M.D. in 1860, and became a fellow of the Royal College of Surgeons in 1861. Jones was awarded the Fellowes gold medal given to the most proficient student in clinical knowledge. He married Hannah Howard Charter in 1863.

Medical career

Jones was house surgeon and physician and a resident medical officer at University College hospital for a period, and then went to Paris, where he continued his studies in medicine and surgery for some months. Jones returned to Sydney in 1861, and was an honorary surgeon at the Sydney infirmary, afterwards the Sydney hospital, for 14 years, and also carried on a general practice in College Street, Sydney. Jones was the first surgeon in Sydney to remove an ovarian tumour successfully.

In 1876, Jones gave up general practice, and established himself as a consultant physician. Jones went to Europe for about three years in 1883, and spent much time studying developments in medicine and in hospital practice. Returning to Sydney he was appointed an honorary consulting physician to the Royal Prince Alfred Hospital, and was then considered to be the leading physician in Sydney. Jones was unanimously elected president of the third intercolonial medical congress held in Sydney in 1892, and in 1896 and 1897 he was president of the New South Wales branch of the British Medical Association. 

In addresses to these bodies he stressed the value of fresh air, pure food, and uninfected milk, and he was quick in realizing the value of X-rays, and the promise of results to be obtained from serum therapy, then in its infancy. He was unceasing in his efforts for the effective treatment of tuberculosis (consumption), and was a pioneer in New South Wales in the use of open air treatment. He was responsible for the opening of the Queen Victoria homes at Thirlmere and at Wentworth Falls for patients in the early stages of tuberculosis, and spent much time in the administration of these institutions. Jones had been one of the founders of the Royal Prince Alfred hospital and was a member of the board from 1878 to 1883. Rejoining the board of this hospital in 1904, he was chairman of its medical board for many years.

Residence

In 1878, Jones built "Llandilo" on a large property in Strathfield bounded by The Boulevarde, Albyn Road, Kingsland Road and Wakeford Road and lived there until his death. 

The property was then subdivided and a group of residents headed by Rev Wheaton, a Congregational minister, bought the house for a school, which was known as Strathfield Grammar School. 

In 1926, the school became part of Trinity Grammar School and today is the landmark building of the Preparatory School campus.

Community activities
Jones took much interest in education and became a member of the senate of the University of Sydney in 1881, and was vice-chancellor from 1904 until 1906. He was a trustee of the Australian Museum, was connected with the Kindergarten Union, was an early member of the Linnean Society, and was for 51 years a member of the Royal Society of New South Wales. He was also actively interested in many charitable institutions and in Trinity Congregational Church, Strathfield, of which he was a deacon. He was a member of council of Camden College, the Congregational theological college and grammar school. Jones was knighted in 1905 for his work in combating tuberculosis  and died in Sydney, survived by three sons and four daughters. Jones was buried in the Congregational section of Rookwood Cemetery.

References

1836 births
1918 deaths
Australian Congregationalists
Australian surgeons
Fellows of the Linnean Society of London
Fellows of the Royal College of Surgeons
Knights Bachelor
Vice-Chancellors of the University of Sydney